Matthew Appleyard or Mathew Appleyard may refer to:
 Sir Matthew Appleyard (c. 1607–1670), MP for Hedon 1661–70
 Matthew Appleyard (died 1700) (c. 1660–1700), MP for Hedon 1689–95

See also 
 Appleyard